A scarecrow is a decoy used to discourage birds from disturbing crops.

Scarecrow(s) or The Scarecrow(s) may also refer to:

Comics
 Scarecrow (DC Comics), a supervillain in the Batman series
 Scarecrow (Marvel Comics), a supervillain
 Straw Man (comics), originally Scarecrow, a Marvel Comics character
 Doctor Syn, a superhero who used `The Scarecrow` as an alternate identity

Film and television

Films
 The Scarecrow (1920 film), an American silent short film starring Buster Keaton
 The Scarecrow (Hollywood Television Theatre), a 1972 American television film presentation of the play by Percy MacKaye (see below)
 Scarecrow (1973 film), an American film starring Gene Hackman and Al Pacino
 The Scarecrow (1982 film), a New Zealand film
 Scarecrow (1984 film), a Russian drama film by Rolan Bykov
 The Scarecrow (1985 film), an Iranian film
 Scarecrows (1988 film), an American horror film
 The Scarecrow (2000 film), an American animated fantasy film
 Kakashi (translated as Scarecrow), a 2001 Japanese horror film
 Scarecrow (2002 film), an American direct-to-video horror film
 The Scarecrow (2013 film), an American animated short film and advertisement
 Scarecrow (2013 film), an American television horror film
 Scarecrows (2017 film), a Canadian horror film
 Scarecrow (2020 film), a Russian drama film

Television
 Scarecrow and Mrs. King, a 1980s American TV series
 "Scarecrow" (The Adventures of the Galaxy Rangers), an episode
 "Scarecrow" (Supernatural), an episode
 "The Scarecrow" (Gotham episode), the fifteenth episode of the television series Gotham
 Scarecrow (Doctor Who), a fictional race

Literature
 Scarecrow (novel), a 2003 novel by Matthew Reilly
 Shane Schofield, or Scarecrow, the protagonist of Scarecrow and other novels by Reilly
 Scarecrow (Oz), one of the main protagonists in L. Frank Baum's The Wonderful Wizard of Oz
 Scarecrow & Other Anomalies, a poetry collection by Oliverio Girondo
 The Scarecrow (Connelly novel), a 2009 crime novel by Michael Connelly
 The Scarecrow, a 2009 novel by Sean Williams
 The Scarecrow (play), a 1908 play by Percy MacKaye
 "The Scarecrow" (short story), a short story by R. L. Stine
 The Scarecrows, a 1981 young-adult novel by Robert Westall
 Scarecrow, a Boogiepop character
 Scarecrow Press, an imprint of Rowman & Littlefield

Music
 The Scarecrow (opera), a 2006 opera by Joseph Turrin

Performers
 Scarecrow (band), an American heavy metal band
 Lord Infamous (1973–2013), also known as The Scarecrow, American rapper
 X Marks the Pedwalk, originally Scarecrow, a German band

Albums
 Scarecrow (Decyfer Down album) or the title song, 2013
 Scarecrow (Garth Brooks album), 2001
 Scarecrow (John Craigie album), 2018
 Scarecrow (John Mellencamp album), 1985
 The Scarecrow (album) or the title song, by Avantasia, 2008
 Scarecrow, by Cats in Space, 2017

Songs
 "Scarecrow" (song), by Melissa Etheridge, 1999
 "The Scarecrow" (song), by Pink Floyd, 1967
 "Scare Crow", by Ministry from Psalm 69: The Way to Succeed and the Way to Suck Eggs, 1992
 "S/C/A/R/E/C/R/O/W" by My Chemical Romance from Danger Days: The True Lives of the Fabulous Killjoys, 2010
 "Scarecrow", by Beck from Guero, 2005
 "Scarecrow", by Counting Crows from Somewhere Under Wonderland, 2014
 "Scarecrow", by the Pillows from Wake Up! Wake Up! Wake Up!, 2007
 "Scarecrow", by Wand from  Laughing Matter, 2019
 "Scarecrows", by Luke Bryan from Kill the Lights, 2015

Other
 Scarecrow (wine), a California wine producer
 Scarecrow Video, a video sales and rental store in Seattle, Washington, US
 Scarecrow, a fictional monster in Dungeons & Dragons

See also